Fair and Muddy is a 1928 Our Gang short silent comedy film directed by Charley Oelze. It was the 75th Our Gang short that was released and was considered to be lost. A print of the film was later discovered in Europe in 2008.

Plot
The gang live at the Gramercy Orphanage operated by Grandpa and Grandma Evans. Next door to the orphanage lives Amanda Schultz, a child-hating spinster who has a drawer full of confiscated baseballs that she has taken from the kids. However, Amanda starts acting nice towards the gang after she receives a telegram stating that she must acquire a child of her own in order to inherit a bequest from a rich uncle.

Grandpa Evans is suspicious of Amanda's actions and tells the kids to make life miserable for her. The gang stick Amanda with pins, attack her chauffeur with a pea shooter and set her friend ablaze. Then a rival gang arrives and a mud battle ensues. Amanda joins the mud bath and ends up winning it for the gang. This experience softens her as she realizes that gang made her feel like a child again.

Cast

The Gang
 Joe Cobb as Joe
 Jackie Condon as Jackie
 Jean Darling as Jean
 Allen Hoskins as Farina
 Bobby Hutchins as Wheezer
 Mildred Kornman as Mildred
 Jay R. Smith as Jay
 Harry Spear as Harry
 Pete the Pup as Pansy

Additional cast
 Johnny Aber as Kid at orphanage
 Bobby Dean as Fat kid at the orphanage
 Donnie Smith as Kid at orphanage
 Bobby Young as Rival gang member
 Edgar Dearing as Motorcycle cop
 Alfred Fisher as Grandpa Evans
 Charles King as Chauffeur
 Florence Lee as Grandma Evans
 Lillianne Leighton as Mrs. Amanda Schultz
 Sam Lufkin as Man laughing 
 Patsy O'Byrne as Character part unknown
 Carolina "Spike" Rankin as Alvira
 Charley Young as Man checking tire

See also
 Our Gang filmography

References

External links

1928 films
1928 comedy films
1928 short films
1920s rediscovered films
American silent short films
American black-and-white films
Metro-Goldwyn-Mayer short films
Our Gang films
Rediscovered American films
1920s American films
Silent American comedy films
1920s English-language films